Jonathan Anidjar Romain  (born 24 August 1954) is a writer and broadcaster and director of Maidenhead Synagogue in Berkshire, England. He has a PhD in the history of British Jewry. He writes for The Times, The Independent, The Guardian, The Huffington Post, and The Jewish Chronicle and appears on radio and television.

Professional career
Romain has been a full-time Tutor at Maidenhead Community Centre since 1980.

From 2007 to 2009, he chaired the Movement for Reform Judaism's Assembly of Rabbis. Since January 2015 he has chaired the Movement's Beth Din.

For several years he was one of the judges for both The Times Preacher of the Year competition and the BBC's Frank Gillard Awards for religious programmes.

He is chaplain to the Jewish Police Association, and until 2018 chaired the Accord Coalition, which he helped found as an alliance of religious and non-religious groups committed to campaigning against religious discrimination in state-funded faith schools.

In 2014 he established Inter-faith leaders for Dignity in Dying (IFDiD), an inter-faith group of clergy, now numbering 50 leaders of many religious affiliations who support the aims of Dignity in Dying. The group calls for a change in the law that would allow terminally ill, mentally competent adults the choice of an having themselves die.

Actions and views
In July 2014, Romain welcomed Lord Carey's support for the Assisted Dying Bill, describing the former archbishop of Canterbury's intervention in the debate as "a breath of fresh air" and saying that Carey's change of view on the issue showed "it is possible to be both religious and in favour of assisted dying".

In 2013, he launched a campaign for recognition of Judaism in China.

His perspective on same-sex marriage is that marriage should be open to all. He argues that "anyone who takes sacred religious texts literally needs to move on with the times... The Bible is not the literal word of God, but the inspiration of God, as perceived by people of that era and subject to the limitations of the period. It, therefore, has to constantly adapt according to new knowledge and new insights."

He supports the legalisation of brothels, referring to Genesis and pointing out that "it is not for nothing that it [prostitution] is known as the oldest profession", adding: "It may be more messianic to want to end the sex trade altogether, but perhaps it is more religious to seek to channel it safely."

In 2014, on the issue of women becoming bishops in the Church of England he was quoted as saying: "Women have long been accepted as rabbis and have gone on to occupy positions of religious authority in both major synagogues and Jewish institutions. Those who thought Judaism would collapse when this happened have been proved resoundingly wrong and I am sure the same will be found in the Church."

Honours
In 2003, he was appointed MBE for his pioneering work in helping mixed-faith couples nationally, a theme covered in his book Till Faith Us Do Part (HarperCollins).

Personal life
He is married to Rabbi Sybil Sheridan. They have four adult sons together.

Publications

Books
Signs and Wonders: a new method of teaching Hebrew, Michael Goulston Educational Foundation (1985; New edition 1992)   
The Jews of England, Jewish Chronicle Publications (1988) 
Faith and Practice: A Guide to Reform Judaism Today, Reform Synagogues of Great Britain (1991) 
(with Anne Kershen) Tradition and Change: A History of Reform Judaism in Britain 1840–1995, Reform Synagogues of Great Britain (1995)   (hardback)  (paperback)
Till Faith Us Do Part: Couples Who Fall in Love Across the Religious Divide, HarperCollins (1996) 
Renewing the Vision, SCM Press (1996) 
Your God Shall Be My God: religious conversion in Britain today, SCM Press (2000)    
Reform Judaism and Modernity: A Reader, a survey of Reform theology, SCM Press (2004)   
God, Doubt and Dawkins, Movement for Reform Judaism (2008) 
Really Useful Prayers, Movement for Reform Judaism (2009) 
Great Reform Lives, Movement for Reform Judaism (2010) 
A Passion for Judaism, Movement for Reform Judaism (2011) 
Royal Jews: A Thousand Years of Jewish Life in and Around the Royal County of Berkshire, Grenfell Publishing (2013) 
 (as editor) Assisted Dying – Rabbinic Responses, Movement for Reform Judaism (2014) 
Confessions of a Rabbi, Biteback Publishing (2017)

Newspaper articles
Contributions to The Guardian
Contributions to The Huffington Post
Contributions to The Independent
"Rabbi, I have a problem" contributions to The Jewish Chronicle

Notes and references

External links
Books by Rabbi Jonathan Romain on Amazon.co.uk

1954 births
Living people
20th-century English rabbis
21st-century English rabbis
Alumni of Leo Baeck College
British Reform rabbis
Clergy from London
English Jewish writers
English people of German-Jewish descent
English rabbis
English radio personalities
English television personalities
The Guardian people
HuffPost writers and columnists
Jewish historians
Members of the Order of the British Empire
People from Hampstead
People from Maidenhead